Elections to the Assembly of Representatives in Mandatory Palestine were held on 6 December 1925, electing the legislature of the Yishuv. Around half the votes went to parties associated with trade unions. Ahdut HaAvoda remained the largest party in the Assembly.

Electoral system
Following the 1920 elections, debate continued on the issue of women's suffrage. In 1923 Mizrachi called for a men-only referendum on whether women should be entitled to vote, and threatened to withdraw from the Yishuv if one was not held. The Jewish National Council agreed to hold one on 8 November 1925, but with female participation. This led to Agudat Yisrael calling for a boycott. In response, Mizrachi and the Jewish National Council agreed to cancel the referendum.

The number of eligible voters rose from around 26,000 to 64,764. However, turnout was only around 57%. This was put down to an Agudat Yisrael boycott, several delays in holding the elections, and the unfamiliarity of some women with voting.

The number of seats was reduced from 314 to 221.

Results

References

Palestine
Elections in Israel
1925 in Mandatory Palestine
December 1925 events
Palestine
Election and referendum articles with incomplete results